Abu Dujana (died 1 August 2017) was an Ansar Ghazwat-ul-Hind militant, former Lashkar-e-Taiba commander and Pakistani national who was killed in a joint anti-militant operation in Pulwama, Jammu and Kashmir. Dujana was Lashkar-e-Taiba's chief commander for the Kashmir Valley. He was listed among the most-wanted in Jammu and Kashmir for several attacks on security forces.

Dujana was the mastermind behind several attacks in the south Kashmir, including one on a CRPF convoy at Pampore and another at the Entrepreneurship Development Institute of India in the Sempora area in 2016.

See also 
 Lashkar-e-Taiba

References

2017 deaths
Lashkar-e-Taiba members
Pakistani Islamists
Year of birth missing